Tiny Urban Kitchen is a blog founded by Jen Che and presents her original recipes and photographs, local restaurant reviews, travel guides, and personal anecdotes. Che is a resident of Cambridge, Massachusetts and a graduate of Massachusetts Institute of Technology.  Before starting Tiny Urban Kitchen, Che worked as a research chemist.

Tiny Urban Kitchen began in 2007 and has earned national recognition since its inception. On April 2, 2010, Che was interviewed for Glamour magazine's daily health and fitness blog, Vitamin G. On April 29, 2010, Tiny Urban Kitchen was named “Best of Blogs” by Food News Journal. Most recently, Che was named the winner of Project Food Blog. Che was one of 700 food bloggers to undergo ten weeks of challenges, including preparing, hosting, and photographing a luxury dinner.  As the winner of the $10,000 prize, Che will be donating the entire sum to charity.

Che has also been featured on wbur.org, Boston's local NPR site, in The Boston Globe, in Time Magazine, and on CNN's Eatocracy.

References

External links
 Official site

American blogs
Websites about food and drink